Dudfield is an English surname. Notable people with the surname include:

Harry Dudfield (1912–1987), New Zealand politician
Lawrie Dudfield (born 1980), English footballer
Tim Dudfield, Australian dance music producer and DJ

See also
Duffield (surname)

English-language surnames